Benkipatna is 2015 Indian Kannada language drama film written and directed by T. K. Dayanand. It stars Prathap Narayan, Anushree and Arun Sagar in the lead roles. The supporting cast features Prakash Belawadi, Jahangir, Rangashankara Manju and B. Suresha. The film is based on real incidents that occurred in the Kodagu district of Karnataka.

Cast
 Prathap Narayan as Hanumanthu
 Anushree as Pavani
 Arun Sagar as Dorai
 Prakash Belawadi as Limba Rama
 M. S. Jahangir
 Rangashankara Manju
 B. Suresha as Babuli
 Kalandar Baba Hebbsale
 Renuka
 Sampath
 Kemparaju Doddatti
 Lakshman
 Sa Su Vishwanath

Production
Benkipatna was the first film of T. K. Dayanand, a former journalist and writer, as a director. The film is based on a real life incident that Dayanand covered as a journalist. Prior to its release, it was revealed that the film is a love story of a youth who makes a living selling rat poison and a manual labourer in a fictional town called Benkipatna. Television host Anushree was signed to play Pavani, the female lead in the film, in her first film as a lead actress.

Soundtrack

Steve and Koushik composed the film's background score and music for its soundtrack. The album consists of nine tracks that includes three spoken dialogues. The album was released on 6 October 2014 in Bangalore.

Critical reception
Upon theatrical release, the film received positive reviews from critics. Muralidhara Khajane of The Hindu felt the film is "a sincere attempt to present the life of pourakarmikas from all possible angles" and that "Besides being pro-life, Benkipatna is all about the ills of society." He concluded writing, "Anushree steals the show with her performance and dialogue delivery. Pratap Narayan does not disappoint. Prakash Belwadi, Arun Sagar and B. Suresh have filled life into their characters." The Times of India in its review rated the film 3/5 and wrote, "Prathap Narayan and Anushree breath life into their characters. With his flawless dialogue delivery, Prakash Belawadi is a treat to watch. Manjunath Gowda, Arun Sagar and B Suresha essay their roles with ease and grace. Music by Steve Kaushik and camerawork by Niranjan Babu are impressive." A. Sharadhaa of The Indian Express felt the film was a "brave attempt" by a debutant director having taken up a "hard-hitting subject". She wrote commending "a decent performance" by the lead actors. The reviewer for Sify.com felt was made on the "ignored class" of the society. On the performances of the lead pair, he wrote, "The unique love story, the rugged looks, the emotions are brilliantly brought out by these two" and added, "Prakash Belawadi's role is small and classic indeed and Arun Sagar is at his best performance till date." he concluded crediting the film's music and called it "melodious and striking."

References

2015 films
Indian drama films
2015 drama films
2010s Kannada-language films